The archaeological heritage of Sri Lanka can be divided into three ages; Prehistoric (Stone-age), Protohistoric (Iron age), and historical period. The presence of man activities in Sri Lanka probably dates from 75,000 years ago (late Pleistocene period). Prehistoric sites which are presently identified in the country are distributed from the maritime belt and the lowland plains of the wet and dry zones to the high plateaus and rain forests in the central and southwestern mountain regions of the island. The protohistoric period expands from about 1000 BC to the historical period at about 500 BC. The main indicators of the distribution of protohistoric and early settlements on the island are the megalithic burials and pottery sites. 

The beginning of the historical period of Sri Lanka is traditionally assigned to the reign of King Devanampiya Tissa (307–267 BC) when the Buddhism was introduced to Sri Lanka by the missionaries sent by the Indian emperor Ashoka. However, the first clear information about the establishment of buildings and structures are dated back to the time of king Pandukabhaya (437–367 BC).

Sri Lanka's political and religious history is mainly set out by the ancient chronicles as well as over 4,000 stone inscriptions from the 3rd century BC onward. Which gives the history in considerable detail from the 3rd century and less reliably back to the 6th century BC.

Sri Lanka has more than 250,000 identified archaeological sites throughout the country and some of them have been declared as archaeological reserves and protected monuments by the Sri Lanka archaeological department. Archaeological reserves are sites that consist of archaeological remains which are under the direct control of the archaeological department. Protected monuments are privately owned but scheduled under section 18 of the Antiquities Ordinance No.09 of 1940.

Declaration of monuments
According to sections 16, 17, 18, and 19 of the Antiquities Ordinance No.09 of 1940, the minister who is in charge of the subject may declare the ancient monuments by notification published in the government Gazette.
Also under sections 16, 17, and 19, ancient buildings and trees on state or private lands, may be declared as ancient monuments to provide safety and protection for them.

Ancient construction with a historical and archaeological value which are over 100 years of age can also be declared as ancient monuments in terms of the provisions of the Antiquities (Amendment) Act No. 24 of 1988.

Central Province

Kandy District

Matale District

Nuwara Eliya District

Eastern Province

Ampara District

Batticaloa District

Trincomalee District

North Central Province

Anuradhapura District

Polonnaruwa District

North Western Province

Kurunegala District

Puttlam District

Northern Province

Jaffna District

Kilinochchi District

Mannar District

Mullaitivu District

Vavuniya District

Sabaragamuwa

Kegalle District

Ratnapura District

Southern Province

Galle District

Hambantota District

Matara District

Uva

Badulla District

Monaragala District

Western Province

Colombo District

Gampaha District

Kalutara District

See also
 Ancient constructions of Sri Lanka
 Solosmasthana

References

Notes

External links
 Department of Archaeology – Sri Lanka
 Ministry of Culture and the Arts

 Archaeological sites in Sri Lanka
Archaeology
Archaeological
Sri Lanka
 Lists of tourist attractions in Sri Lanka